Hinckley & Rugby Building Society is a building society based in Hinckley, Leicestershire, UK. It dates from a merger in 1983, with origins claimed to date back to 1861.

Origins 

Hinckley & Rugby Building Society's history dates back to 1861 when the Rugby Provident Building Society was founded. Much of the Rugby's history was lost when it was merged with its Hinckley counterpart in 1983.

The Hinckley Freehold Land and Permanent Building Society opened for business in November 1865, managed by Thomas Kiddle from his draper’s shop in Castle Street, Hinckley. The society changed its name to The Hinckley Permanent Building Society in 1907, still run by the family. In 1959, Geoffrey Kiddle moved on, ending the Kiddle family’s almost century-long association with the Society.

The Society’s first proper branch opened in 1964 in Friar Lane, Leicester, swiftly followed by further branches in South Wigston and Barlestone. A new head office was built in Upper Bond Street, Hinckley, and officially opened in 1970. The Society can still be found to this day at 37 Castle Street, a Grade II listed building dating back to the 18th century. 

In 1979, the Society’s name changed once more to Hinckley Building Society. Three years later in 1982 it was agreed to merge with the Rugby Provident Building Society and, on 1 March 1983 it became Hinckley & Rugby Building Society.

21st century
By the end of 2017 the Hinckley & Rugby Building Society had mortgage lending of £193 million and a retail savings balance of £576 million. Assets had increased to a value of £741 million. Pre-tax profits in 2016 were £341,000, increasing to £1.3 million in 2017.

Colin Fyfe, formerly Chief Executive of the Darlington Building Society, became Chief Executive of Hinckley & Rugby in November 2018, taking over following the retirement of Chris White, who had held the post for the previous 11 years.

In June 2019 the Society moved to a new state-of-the-art Head Office in Upper Bond Street, Hinckley, after acquiring and converting the former Hinckley Magistrates Court building.

References

External links
Hinckley and Rugby Building Society

Hinckley
Building societies of England
Banks established in 1983
Organizations established in 1983
Organisations based in Leicestershire
1983 establishments in England